Alphawezen is a German electronic duo formed in 1998, consisting of Asu Yalcindag (vocals, lyrics) and Ernst Wawra (music).

In the beginning, Alphawezen was an instrumental project, but with the first official album L'après-midi d'un Microphone (2001, Mole Listening Pearls) and with the co-operation of singer Asu it became a kind of ambient electronic pop music. Their style can also be considered as downtempo.

In Anne Fontaines Film Nathalie... with Emmanuelle Béart and Gérard Depardieu (2003), the Alphawezen song "Gai Soleil" is used in a club scene.
In October 2007, the third Alphawezen album Comme Vous Voulez was released at Mole Listening Pearls. In November 2009, the double CD Snow/Glow was released, including remixes by Nightmares on Wax and The Timewriter.

A single entitled "Smile" has been released in August 2011.

Discography

Albums 
 Comme Vous Voulez (re-titled Freeze in France) (2007 / CD Album)
 En Passant (2004 / CD Album)
 L'après-midi d'un Microphone (2001 / CD Album)

Singles/Maxis 
 My Funny Valentine (2016 / Single)
 Smile (2011 / Single)
 Gun Song/ Days Remixes (2009 / 12" Vinyl)
 I Like You (2008 / download)
 Speed Of Light (2004 / download)
 Welcome To Machinarchy (2004 / 12" Vinyl Maxi)
 The Bruxelles EP (2004 / download)
 Into The Stars (2001 / 12" Vinyl Maxi)
 Gai Soleil (2000 / 12" Vinyl Maxi)

Compilations 
 Snow/Glow (2009 / 2xCD)

Videography 
2023   Freeze
2011   Smile
2008   Days
2005   Speed of Light
2002   Electricity Drive
2001   Into the Stars
2000   Frost
1999   Gai Soleil

References

External links
 Official Band Site
 Label page
 Alphawezen on soundcloud
 Alphawezen on discogs

German musical groups